This is a list of hospitals in Alberta sorted by the hospital name. It is sortable by the column headings.

See also

List of hospitals in Canada

 
Alberta
Hospitals